This is a list of FIU Panthers football players in the NFL draft.

Key

Selections

References 

Florida International

FIU Panthers NFL Draft